Stegodyphus mimosarum, the African social velvet spider, is a species of the genus Stegodyphus, one of the velvet spiders. It is a social species, which is found in South Africa and Madagascar. The genome sequence was published in 2014. Similar to closely related species such as Stegodyphus sarasinorum, S. mimosarum engages in communal living which involves remaining with the same colony even when prey availability is low, moving away in order to expand the nest not due to lack of food.

References

External links
World Spider Catalog: Stegodyphus mimosarum Pavesi, 1883

Eresidae
Spiders of Africa
Spiders described in 1883